Thout 21 - Coptic Calendar - Thout 23

The twenty-second day of the Coptic month of Thout, the first month of the Coptic year. On a common year, this day corresponds to September 19, of the Julian Calendar, and October 2, of the Gregorian Calendar. This day falls in the Coptic season of Akhet, the season of inundation.

Commemorations

Saints 

 The martyrdom of Saint Cotylas, Saint Axoua his sisiter, and Saint Tatas his friend 
 The martyrdom of Saint Julius of Aqfahs, the Hagiographer, and his companions

References 

Days of the Coptic calendar